Zsombor Berecz may refer to:

 Zsombor Berecz (sailor) (born 1986), Hungarian sailor
 Zsombor Berecz (footballer) (born 1995), Hungarian footballer